Philippe Georget is a French writer, the author of five crime novels. He was born on 8 August 1962 in Épinay-sur-Seine and lives in Perpignan. His books have won several prizes and three have been translated into English, starting with Summertime All the Cats Are Bored in 2013.

Novels
L'été tous les chats s'ennuient, Éditions Jigal, (2009) ; English translation Summertime All the Cats Are Bored, Europa Editions, (2013) 
Le Paradoxe du cerf-volant, Editions Jigal, (2011) 
Les Violents de l'automne, Éditions Jigal, (2012) ; English translation, Autumn, All The Cats Return, Europa Editions, (2014) 
Tendre comme les pierres, Éditions Jigal, (2014) 
Méfaits d'hiver, Éditions Jigal, (2015) ; English translation Crimes of Winter, Europa Editions, (2017)

Awards and achievements
 2011 : Prix SNCF du polar 2011 for L'été tous les chats s'ennuient
 2011 : Prix du premier roman policier de la ville de Lens 2011 for L'été tous les chats s'ennuient
 2013 : Prix de l'Embouchure for Les Violents de l'automne
 2016 : Prix Méditerranée Roussillon for Méfaits d'hiver
 2017 : Prix EuroPolar des Bibliothèques de la Ville d'Argenteuil for Le Paradoxe du cerf-volant

External links
 Languedoc-Roussillon Livre et lecture : Philippe Georget

References

1962 births
Living people
French crime fiction writers
20th-century French novelists
21st-century French novelists
20th-century French male writers
21st-century French male writers